Girls of the Latin Quarter is a 1960 British musical film directed by Alfred Travers and starring Bernard Hunter, Jill Ireland and Sheldon Lawrence.

Plot
Under the terms of a will, a young man stands to inherit a fortune if he can he turn the prospects of the family farm around. He comes up with a scheme to raise money by putting on a Show.

Cast
 Bernard Hunter as Clive Smedley
 Jill Ireland as Jill
 Sheldon Lawrence as Mac
 Danny Green as Hodgson
 Joe Baker as Finch 
 Sonya Cordeau as herself - Singer
 Cuddly Dudley as himself - Singer
 Mimi Pearce as herself - Dancer
 Cherry Wainer as herself - Organist

References

Bibliography
 Chibnall, Steve & McFarlane, Brian. The British 'B' Film. Palgrave MacMillan, 2009.

External links

1960 films
British musical films
1960 musical films
1960s English-language films
Films directed by Alfred Travers
Films set in Paris
1960s British films